Lars Evert Huldén (5 February 1926 – 11 October 2016) was a Swedish-speaking Finn writer, scholar and translator. Born in Jakobstad, Finland, he was professor at Helsinki university 1964–1989. In 1986 Huldén received an honorary doctorate from the Faculty of Humanities at Uppsala University, Sweden. He was a member of the Norwegian Academy of Science and Letters from 1993.

He has researched Carl Michael Bellman, Johan Ludvig Runeberg, Swedish dialects and toponomy.

Lars Huldén and his son Mats Huldén translated Kalevala into Swedish in 1999. Huldén died at the age of 90 on 11 October 2016 in Helsinki.

Awards and honors
In 2000, he won the Swedish Academy Nordic Prize, known as the "little Nobel".

References

Further reading
 

1926 births
2016 deaths
People from Jakobstad
Finnish writers in Swedish
Finnish translators
20th-century translators
Members of the Norwegian Academy of Science and Letters

Swedish-speaking Finns